The Château de Montastruc is a château in Lamonzie-Montastruc, Dordogne, Nouvelle-Aquitaine, France.

Châteaux in Dordogne
Monuments historiques of Dordogne